USS Lehigh (AK-192) was an Alamosa class cargo ship that was constructed by the United States Navy during the closing period of World War II. She was declared excess-to-needs and returned to the United States Maritime Commission shortly after commissioning.

Construction
The second ship to be so named by the Navy, Lehigh was laid down under a Maritime Commission contract, MC hull 2123, by Walter Butler Shipbuilding Co., Superior, Wisconsin, 8 June 1944; launched 25 November 1944; sponsored by Mrs. Stanley Butler; acquired by the Navy 30 July 1945; placed in service the same day for ferrying from Beaumont, Texas, to Galveston, Texas; placed out of service on the 31st; and commissioned at New Orleans 13 September 1945.

Post-war decommissioning
Because of the reduced need for cargo ships following World War II, Lehigh decommissioned 6 November 1945 and was turned over to the War Shipping Administration (WSA) the same day, and her name was reverted to Coastal Expounder.

Merchant service
Coastal Expounder was used by several shipping companies from 1945–1947, when she was placed in the reserve fleet before being transferred then sold to Lloyd Brasileiro, Patrimônio Nicional, of Brazil.

On 7 March 1947, she was sold for $693,862 and renamed Rio Solimões. She was scrapped in 1969.

Notes 

Citations

Bibliography 

Online resources

External links

 

Alamosa-class cargo ships
Lehigh County, Pennsylvania
Ships built in Superior, Wisconsin
1944 ships
World War II auxiliary ships of the United States